William Walter Clark (July 7, 1885May 15, 1971) was an American educator, farmer, and Republican politician.  He represented Wood County in the Wisconsin State Assembly for fourteen years, and was twice elected to the Wisconsin State Senate from the 24th Senate district.

Biography
Clark was born on July 7, 1885, in Plum City, Wisconsin. After graduating from high school in Ellsworth, Wisconsin, he attended what are now the University of Wisconsin-River Falls and the University of Wisconsin-Madison. He married Estella Lillian Junkman. Clark died on May 15, 1971, and is buried in Wisconsin Rapids, Wisconsin.

Career
Clark was a member of the Assembly three times. First, from 1921 to 1922, second, from 1939 to 1940 and third, from 1943 to 1952. During this time, he was a delegate to the 1948 Republican National Convention. Clark then went on to serve in the Senate from the 24th district from 1953 to 1960, at which time he was succeeded by John M. Potter. Additionally, he was Chairman of Hansen, Wisconsin, and of the Wood County Board.

References

See also
The Political Graveyard
 

People from Pierce County, Wisconsin
People from Wood County, Wisconsin
County supervisors in Wisconsin
Republican Party Wisconsin state senators
Republican Party members of the Wisconsin State Assembly
University of Wisconsin–River Falls alumni
University of Wisconsin–Madison alumni
1885 births
1971 deaths
Burials in Wisconsin
20th-century American politicians